Homecoming is a professional wrestling event held by Impact Wrestling. The first event was held in 2019 and saw the promotion's return to its initial home arena, The Asylum in Nashville, Tennessee, where Impact (then known as Total Nonstop Action Wrestling (TNA)) originally held weekly pay-per-view events from 2002 to 2004. The event would return in 2021 as a special that aired exclusively on the promotion's streaming service, Impact Plus, and was held at Skyway Studios, also located in Nashville.

Events

References

External links
 Impact Wrestling official website

Impact Wrestling pay-per-view events